Begadang is an Indonesian film released in 1978 and directed by Maman Firmansyah. This film stars, among others, Rhoma Irama, Yati Octavia, and Billy Argo.

Indonesian drama films
1978 films